Eduard Krüger (25 July 1901 – 27 June 1967) was a German architect. His work was part of the architecture event in the art competition at the 1936 Summer Olympics.

References

1901 births
1967 deaths
20th-century German architects
Olympic competitors in art competitions
People from Calw